Water for Canitoga (German: Wasser für Canitoga) is a 1939 German western film directed by Herbert Selpin and starring Hans Albers, Charlotte Susa and Josef Sieber. The film is a "Northern", set in Canada in 1905 where an engineer is working to construct a new water supply system despite repeated attempts at sabotage. It is based on a play by Hans Rehfisch, Otto Eis and Egon Eis.

It was made at the Bavaria Studios in Munich. The film's sets were designed by the art directors Wilhelm Depenau, Ludwig Reiber and Arthur Schwarz.

Cast
 Hans Albers as Ingenieur Captain Oliver Montstuart / Bauingenieur Nicholsen
 Charlotte Susa as Lilly
 Josef Sieber as Ingenieur Ingram
 Peter Voß as Chefingenieur Captain Gilbert Trafford
 Hilde Sessak as Sekretärin Winifred Gardener
 Andrews Engelmann as Ruski
 Karl Dannemann as Dyke
 Hans Mierendorff as Old Shatterhand
 Heinrich Schroth as Gouverneur
 Ernst Fritz Fürbringer as Sheriff von Canitoga
 Beppo Brem as Sprengmeister bei der Sabotage
 Willy Rösner as Bauarbeiter Reeve
 Carl Wery as Vorarbeiter Westbrook
 Heinrich Kalnberg as Sprengmeister Reechy
 Katja Bennefeld as Straßenmädchen in der Silvesternacht
 Peter Busse as Silvesterfeiernder
 Henry Pleß as Vormann an der Pressluftzentrale
 Fritz Reiff as Ormand, Adjutant des Gouverneurs
 Arthur Reinhardt as Baustellenarbeiter
 Ernst Rotmund as Direktor
 Herta de Salvador as Barfrau
 Arnulf Schröder as Lagerarzt
 Bruno Ziener as Professor Deutsch
 Louis Brody as Johnny

References

Bibliography
 Hull, David Stewart. Film in the Third Reich: a study of the German cinema, 1933-1945. University of California Press, 1969.

External links

1939 films
1939 Western (genre) films
1930s historical films
German Western (genre) films
German historical films
Films of Nazi Germany
1930s German-language films
Films directed by Herbert Selpin
Films set in 1905
Northern (genre) films
German films based on plays
Bavaria Film films
Films shot at Bavaria Studios
German black-and-white films
1930s German films